Les Barrett (born 22 October 1947) is an English former professional footballer, making the third-all-time record appearances for Fulham of 487 starts and 4 substitutions.

He scored a total of 90 goals for the club, and was the team's top scorer in Fulham's Third Division promotion season of 1970–1971, with 15 goals. He was a fan-favourite at Fulham, and now lives a quiet life running a small market garden in Earlsfield. Whilst at Fulham he played in the 1975 FA Cup Final.

References

External links

 California Surf stats

1947 births
Living people
English footballers
England under-23 international footballers
Fulham F.C. players
Millwall F.C. players
North American Soccer League (1968–1984) players
California Surf players
Woking F.C. players
Footballers from Wandsworth
Association football midfielders
English expatriate sportspeople in the United States
Expatriate soccer players in the United States
English expatriate footballers
FA Cup Final players